The Chechen National Army or Chechen Armed Forces were the united militarized formations of the de facto Chechen Republic of Ichkeria.

On October 15, 2022, the Armed Forces of the Chechen Republic of Ichkeria were officially resurrected in Ukraine by the Government of Ichkeria in exile, with a center being on the units contributing to the Chechen involvement in the 2022 Russian invasion of Ukraine, such as Separate Special Purpose Battalion.

Defence Ministers of Chechnya 
 Magomed Khanbiev (1998—2004)
 Rustaman Makhauri (2004—2007)

Branches

Ground Forces 
Dudayev spent the years from 1991 to 1994 preparing for war, mobilizing men aged 15–55 and seizing Russian weapons depots. This was seen as a bid to prop up Chechnya's independence and sovereignty. Major weapons systems were seized from the Russian military in 1992, and on the eve of the First Chechen War they included 23 air defense guns, 108 APC/tanks, 24 artillery pieces, 5 MiG-17/15, 2 Mi-8 helicopters, 24 multiple rocket launchers, 17 surface to air missile launchers. The ground forces counted 10,000 troops in December 1994, rising to 40,000 soldiers by early 1996.

Structure:

 General Staff
 Special Purpose Regiment
 Tank Regiment
 Separate Aviation Detachment
 Military college
 Civil defense units

Air Force 

As a result of the withdrawal from the Chechen Republic in 1992, parts of the Russian army were left with almost all weapons, including aircraft and air defense systems. At the Kalinovskaya Airbase, the Armavir Aviation School left 39 combat training aircraft L-39 Albatross, 80 L-29 Dolphin, 3 MiG-17 fighters, 2 MiG-15UTI training aircraft, 6 An-2 aircraft and 2 helicopters Mi-8. The military also had 94 L-29 trainer aircraft, 52 L-39 trainer aircraft, 6 An-22 transport aircraft, and 5 Tu-134 transport aircraft. Most of the Chechen aviation equipment was destroyed at airfields in the very first days of the Chechen campaign. The air defense of the air bases consisted of 10 Strela-10 air defense systems, 23 anti-aircraft artillery installations of various types and 7 Igla MANPADS. In addition, according to some media reports, the units of the Mujahideen who fought in Chechnya had a certain number of American-made Stinger MANPADS.

Bases 
Three air bases were used to base the Chechen aviation forces:

 Airbase "Grozny - Severny"
 Airbase "Kalinovskaya"
 Khankala airbase

It was also reported about the ongoing work on the adaptation of several sections of highways for the basing of aircraft.

National Guard 

The Chechen National Guard was a major formation in Chechnya and its military. On March 13, 1997, President Aslan Maskhadov, established the National Guard of the Chechen Republic of Ichkeria, which was to become the only regular armed formation, on the basis of the Armed Force s of the CRI. Brigadier General Magomed Khanbiev was appointed commander of the CRI National Guard. The number of the National Guardsmen was 2,000 and it included the autonomous Presidential Guard, which was directly subordinate to the President, and the Sharia Guard, which was at the disposal of the Supreme Shariah Court of the CRI. In addition, individual battalions were subordinate to the General Staff and the chairman of the government.

Organizational structure 

 National Guard Units
 1st Battalion of the National Guard named after Umalt Dashaev
 2nd Battalion of the National Guard named after Khamzat Khankarov
 3rd Battalion of the National Guard named after Dzhokhar Dudayev
 8th Argun National Guard Battalion
 10th Shali Armored Battalion of the National Guard
 Engineer Battalion
 Presidential Guard
 Sharia Guard (Islamic religious police)
 Security Battalion of the General Staff of the Armed Forces
 Special Battalion under the Cabinet of Ministers of the CRI

Other paramilitary/security formations 
 Interior Ministry
 Department of National Security - Based on the former Soviet KGB
 Anti-terrorist Center under the President of the CRI - In May 1997, the Anti-Terrorist Center was created under the President of the CRI, headed by the field commander Khunkar-Pasha Israpilov.

See also

 Abkhazian Armed Forces
 Armed Forces of South Ossetia
 Armed Forces of Transnistria
 Artsakh Defence Army
 Donbas People’s Militia
 Luhansk People's Republic People’s Militia

References

Chechen Republic of Ichkeria
Military units and formations established in 1991
Chechen Republic of Ichkeria
Paramilitary organizations based in Russia
Guerrilla organizations